Dos Bocas may refer to the following places:

, a port in Mexico
Dos Bocas Refinery
Dos Bocas, Corozal, Puerto Rico, a barrio
Dos Bocas River
Dos Bocas, Trujillo Alto, Puerto Rico, a barrio
Dos Bocas Lake